Dobiecin may refer to the following places:
Dobiecin, Łódź Voivodeship (central Poland)
Dobiecin, Gmina Chynów in Masovian Voivodeship (east-central Poland)
Dobiecin, Gmina Mogielnica in Masovian Voivodeship (east-central Poland)